Bahlsen is a German food company based in Hanover. It was founded in July 1889 by Hermann Bahlsen (1859–1919) as the "Hannoversche Keksfabrik H. Bahlsen". German politician Ernst Albrecht (1930–2014) was CEO of Bahlsen in the 1970s and the press gave him the nickname "Cookie Monster".

Bahlsen produces a range of biscuits and cakes. Its best-known product is the Leibniz-Keks (butter biscuit), introduced in 1891. It also makes products such as chocolate-dipped Pick Up! snack bars. Bahlsen operates five production facilities in Europe and exports products to about 55 countries. It also does private-label production.

It remains funded by private capital.

Between 1943 and 1945, Bahlsen used approximately 200 forced labourers. The majority of the labourers were women from Nazi occupied Ukraine.

In February 2013, a gilded bronze sign in the form of a biscuit that hung outside the corporate headquarters in Hanover was stolen overnight. A ransom demand was received asking for donations to a local children's hospital. The sign was returned without payment of the ransom.

From 1999 to 2018, Werner Michael Bahlsen was the sole shareholder and at the same time managing director. Today he is the chairman of the board of directors.

Key personnel

Management board:

 Scott Brankin
 Jörg Hönemann
 Daniela Mündler

Chairman of the Governance Board: 
 Werner M. Bahlsen

References

External links

 
 

German brands
Food and drink companies of Germany
Manufacturing companies based in Hanover